Norway competed at the 2022 World Games held in Birmingham, United States from 7 to 17 July 2022. Athletes representing Norway won two gold medals, two silver medals and one bronze medal. The country finished in 26th place in the medal table.

Medalists

Competitors
The following is the list of number of competitors in the Games.

Archery

Norway competed in archery.

Beach handball

Norway won one silver medal in beach handball.

Canoe marathon

Norway competed in canoe marathon.

Dancesport

Norway competed in dancesport (breaking).

Orienteering

Norway won three medals in orienteering.

Powerlifting

Norway won one gold medal in powerlifting.

Men

Women

Sumo

Norway competed in sumo.

References

Nations at the 2022 World Games
2022
World Games